The House of Martinussio (also Martinuscio, Martinusso, Martinus) were a noble family of the Republic of Ragusa.

History 
The family descended from comes Gervasius ( 1186–90) and his son Martinussius (fl. 1234–43). In the beginning of the 15th century Ragusan nobility were present in Novo Brdo as merchants or mining lords; Martinussio were also present. The family was extinct by 1595. They were not related to the Martini in Spalato, Martinuscio in Zara, or Martinussio in Cattaro.

Members
Vulci(g)na de Martinussio
Nicola de Martinussio, iudex
Angelus de Martinussio
Micha(el) de Martinussio

References

Sources

Ragusan noble families